The 11th National Geographic Bee was held in Washington, D.C. on May 26, 1999, sponsored by the National Geographic Society. The final competition was moderated by Jeopardy! host Alex Trebek. The winner was David Beihl, a homeschooled student from Saluda, South Carolina, who won a $25,000 college scholarship and an all-expense-paid trip to Australia. The 2nd-place winner,  Jason Borschow of St. John's School in Condado, Puerto Rico, won a $15,000 scholarship. The 3rd-place winner, Tanveer Ali of Flint, Michigan, won a $10,000 scholarship.

References

External links
 National Geographic Bee Official Website

National Geographic Bee